Lime Point Lighthouse is a lighthouse in California, on the northern side of the narrowest part of Golden Gate strait. The lighthouse sits at the base of a steep cliff, very near the North anchorage of the Golden Gate Bridge.

History

The brick structure for the Lime Point Lighthouse was built in 1883 as a fog-bell signaling station. It was eventually fitted with coal powered  steam whistles. During operation, the facility included the fog signal building, a coal shed, water tank and a two-story keeper's quarters. The keeper's building was later upgraded to include a third floor.

In 1902, the coal-powered steam horn was modified to use crude oil to reduce operating costs and smoke pollution.

Lime Point Lighthouse continued to operate after the completion of the Golden Gate Bridge since it remained an effective position for a light and fog horn, even though Fort Point Light, at the South end of the bridge was decommissioned. Lime Point was automated by the United States Coast Guard in 1961, and the three-story dwelling and other buildings were torn down, leaving only the fog signal building, which remains.

See also

 List of lighthouses in the United States

References

External links
 Lime Point Lighthouse Page at www.us-lighthouses.com

Lighthouses completed in 1883
Lighthouses in the San Francisco Bay Area
Transportation buildings and structures in Marin County, California